Gessella is a fossil genus of liverworts in the family Haplomitriaceae.  All known fossils come from Early Permian deposits of Western Sealand.

References 

Calobryales
Permian plants
Liverwort genera
Prehistoric plant genera